Drawbridge in Nieuw-Amsterdam is a watercolor created in November 1883 by Vincent van Gogh in Drente, The Netherlands.

Watercolor painting
Van Gogh wrote to his brother, Theo, of the view outside his room in Nieuw-Amsterdam, Drenthe:  "I now have a reasonably large room where a stove has been placed, where there happens to be a small balcony. From which I can even see the heath with the huts. I also look out on a very curious drawbridge." Within the letter he drew a sketch of the bridge, which became the watercolor, Drawbridge in Nieuw-Amsterdam.

The work was one of 148 watercolors made by Van Gogh, who said of working in that medium in 1881:
What a splendid thing watercolour is to express atmosphere and distance, 
so that the figure is surrounded by air and can breathe in it, as it were.

Five years after having made this work, van Gogh made Langlois Bridge at Arles in France which captures a lighter mood.

See also
 Early works of Vincent van Gogh
 Langlois Bridge at Arles (Van Gogh series)

Notes

References

Further reading
 John E. Sweetman. The artist and the bridge: 1700-1920. Ashgate; 1999. .

1883 paintings
Paintings by Vincent van Gogh
Watercolor paintings
Paintings in the Netherlands
Water in art
Bridges in art